The 2016–17 CERH Women's European Cup is the 11th season of Europe's premier female club roller hockey competition organized by CERH.

Teams

Results
The draw was held at CERH headquarters in Lisbon, Portugal, on 6 September 2015.

Final four
The final four tournament took place on 25 and 26 March 2017 in Gijón, Spain.

Semi-finals

Final

Top goalscorers

Source:

See also
2016–17 CERH European League
2016–17 CERS Cup

References

External links
 

Rink Hockey European Female League
CERH
CERH